Yusnier Viera (born April 26, 1982) is a Cuban American mental calculator. He is well known as "The Human Calendar" for his world record on calendar dates. On October 31, 2005 he broke for first time the World Record for calendar calculations. At the Mental Calculation World Cup in 2010 he won the calendar category. He currently has three World Records for calendar calculations.

Viera has appeared in prestigious TV channels like CNN & ABC and has starred on the international Discovery Channel Series "Superhuman Showdown" (trailer). In early 2014, he participated in the Latin American show "Super Cerebros", of NatGeo. He won the first round and $4,500 of cash prize, reaching the final round of the show.

Due to his extraordinary skills, University of Sussex neuroscientists took fMRI scans of his brain. In the study, he also completed a computerized version of the Raven's Progressive Matrices Test with an IQ score of 157 (standard deviation of 15). The scientists concluded that his expertise is a result of long-term practice and motivation.

On 2016, Yusnier participated in the Fox show "Superhumans" where he showed a new skill called "flash math". Later, he was invited to "The Ellen DeGeneres Show"  for an impressive demonstration.

Recently, he published the books Basic Course of Mental Arithmetic and Master the Multiplication Tables.

Television Shows

References 

1982 births
Living people
People from Bejucal
Mental calculators
21st-century Cuban mathematicians